"Gatúbela" (Spanish for "Catwoman") is a song by Colombian singer-songwriter Karol G and Puerto Rican rapper Maldy. It was written by Giraldo, Maldy, Justin Quiles, Lenny Tavárez and Marvin Hawkins and produced by the latter and Giraldo. The song was released on August 25, 2022 through Universal Music Latino, as the second single from her fourth studio album, Mañana Será Bonito.

Background 
The song was announced a day prior to its release through Karol G's social media platforms with the title, release date and a clip of the music video. The song was released the following day on August 25, 2022.

Critical reception 
Jessica Roiz from Billboard described the song as "an infectious old-school reggaeton laced with intense perreo beats. […] Karol G is fiery and unapologetic."

Commercial performance 
"Gatúbela" debuted and peaked at number 37 on the US Billboard Hot 100 chart dated September 10, 2022. It became Giraldo's fifth top 40 hit and Maldy's first entry as a soloist.

On the US Billboard Hot Latin Songs chart dated September 10, 2022 the song debuted and peaked at number 4, becoming Giraldo's milestone tenth top five on the chart. It became Maldy's first top ten and first appearance on the chart as a soloist.

On the Billboard Global 200 the song debuted and peaked at number 23 on the chart dated September 10, 2022.

Music video 
The music video for "Gatúbela" was directed by Pedro Artola and was released on Karol G's YouTube channel on August 25, 2022.

Controversy 
Hours before dropping the video, Karol G turned to Instagram to say that it had been blocked by YouTube in some countries for "content" (since almost at the end of the video, the singer appears with blood and half-naked on a beach). Hours later the video was again available.

Charts

Weekly charts

Year-end charts

Certifications

References 

2022 singles
2022 songs
Karol G songs
Spanish-language songs
Universal Music Latino singles
Songs written by Karol G